Orville E. Neale was an American football coach. He served as the head football coach at Virginia Agricultural and Mechanical College and Polytechnic Institute (VPI)—now Virginia Tech—from 1930 to 1931, compiling a record of 8–7–3.

Head coaching record

References

Year of birth missing
Year of death missing
Virginia Tech Hokies football coaches
McDaniel Green Terror football players